Three Ships is a brand of whisky distilled at the James Sedgwick distillery in Wellington, Western Cape (Drakenstein Local Municipality), South Africa. The distillery produces both malt and grain whiskies on the same site, which is unusual for whisky distilleries. The Three Ships range includes blended and single malt whiskies. Three Ships is owned by Distell, a multinational brewing and beverage company based in South Africa.

Andy Watts is currently the Master Distiller, only the 6th since the distillery was established in 1886.

Varieties 
 Three Ships Select
 Three Ships 5 Year Old Premium Select
 Three Ships 10 Year Old Single Malt
 Three Ships Bourbon Cask Finish
 Three Ships Oloroso

Recognition 
In 2012, the World Whiskies Awards selected Three Ships 5 Year Old Premium Select as World's Best Blended Whisky. In 2015, Three Ships 10 Year Old Single Malt won Best African Single Malt.

External links

References 

South African brands
South African whisky
Economy of the Western Cape
Drakenstein